Calliostoma milneedwardsi is a species of sea snail, a marine gastropod mollusk in the family Calliostomatidae.

Description
The height of the shell attains 44 mm.

Distribution
This species occurs in the Atlantic Ocean off Mauritania.

References

  Locard A. (1898). Expéditions scientifiques du Travailleur et du Talisman pendant les années 1880, 1881, 1882 et 1883. Mollusques testacés. Paris, Masson.vol. 2 [1898], pp. 1–515, pl. 1–18

External links
 

milneedwardsi
Gastropods described in 1898